Aghvan is a masculine Armenian given name. Notable people with the name include:

Aghvan Chatinyan (born 1927), Armenian mountain climber
Aghvan Grigoryan (born 1969), Armenian weightlifter
Aghvan Hovsepyan (born 1953), Armenian lawyer
Aghvan Mkrtchyan (born 1981), Armenian footballer
Aghvan Papikyan (born 1994), Polish-born Armenian footballer
Aghvan Vardanyan (born 1958), Armenian politician

Armenian masculine given names